Xavier and Ophelia is an American indie rock and electropop music duo based in Nashville, Tennessee. Formed in 2009, members include DeAnna Moore (vocals) and Dave Tough (keyboards, guitar, bass). The band has released two albums including their debut Xavier & Ophelia, which had songs win industry awards. "Falling Down," a track from their 2012 sophomore album I Hate Birds, won Grand Prize at the 2013 John Lennon Songwriting Contest. Their songs have been placed in movies, television and commercials, and in 2013 their song "Heartbeat" was featured on Twisted.

According to Raw Ramp, "their sounds combine easy-listening melodies with electronic pop elements...[and] the angelic voice of DeAnna Moore is always centre-stage." Much of their music utilizes both live instruments and electronic production. The duo often performs live with a backing band, with regular venues including The Bluebird Cafe in Nashville.

History

2009-10: Founding
Before co-founding the band Xavier and Ophelia with DeAnna Moore, American producer and musician Dave Tough had been writing music for television, film, and other artists for over a decade. Having studied under music engineers such as Bruce Swedien and Neil Citron, he had also been a voting member of The Recording Academy.

Members Tough and Moore first met in 2009 over Myspace, when Tough was searching for vocalists for a demo. At the time Tough was still working as a producer, songwriter, and multi-instrumentalist, and just earlier that year had won his first Grand Prize at the John Lennon Songwriting Contest in the country category. After meeting up in person, they discovered a shared fascination with older jazz standards and artists such as Fiona Apple, Goldfrapp and Edie Brickell. Stated Music and Musicians Magazine, "It was a lucky break when Dave Tough found DeAnna Moore on MySpace...in Moore he found a musical chameleon keen on jazz, New Wave and Kings of Leon."

They soon formed the musical duo Xavier & Ophelia, with the band name originating from a pair of toy dolls. Also going by the moniker X&O, Moore contributes vocals while Tough handles production and instrumentals. Both members contribute to the songwriting process, and they began writing songs that variously integrated the genres of synthpop, electronica, pop, alternative rock, and indie rock. Early on the band was based in Cane Ridge, Tennessee and Antioch, Tennessee.

2011: X&O

The duo released their first album, Xavier & Ophelia, on April 1, 2011, on Real Life Music and Blue Pie Distribution. For a time the album's track "Six Billion Lonely People" was in rotation on the BBS Radio 24-hour music station,  and in 2011 the band was an SGX Radio featured artist. At the 2011 International Songwriting Competition the band was a semi-finalist with "Six Billion Lonely People,"  and the song was a finalist in the 2012 Songdoor Songwriting Competition as well. The song had been written with the assistance of John Foster, also known for playing with the Beach Boys in the early 2000s. "Last Recorded Summer," a pop song on the album written by Moore, Tough, and Neil Barber, was nominated in the  Indie International Songwriting Contest, and was also a finalist in the UK Songwriting Competition.

Critical reception

The album met with a largely positive reception among critics. According to Anna Maria Stjärnell of Luna Kafé e-zine, "Their debut is mellow and mostly very touching pop." Music News Nashville called the album an "unlikely blend of electronica, classic pop melodies and delicate vocal deliveries." It also praised the production, stating "techno beats, computerized sounds, live instruments and lovely, layered vocals mixed together put a unique stamp on their clean productions."

Seven of the nine songs on the album are original, excluding covers of Kings of Leon's song "Use Somebody" and Jackson C. Frank's folk song "Milk & Honey." About the latter, Music News Nashville stated "Moore and Tough give a haunting, cinematic feel to their version."

Music Think Tank described the song "Six Billion Lonely People" as "Electronic pop with acoustic elements and classic melodies reminiscent of Imogen Heap and Goldfrapp, featuring the breathy and angelic voice of DeAnna Moore." According to Luna Kafé e-zine,  the song "uses Moore's vocals well, recalling Edie Brickell at her best." About other tracks, "'Chateau Marmont' is a catchy number that recalls Saint Etienne in its summery haze. 'Passing Train' is equally lovely, a folksy melody setting the scene for a lullaby in blue." Also, "Use Somebody" is "presented here as a neon-bright dance track."

2012: I Hate Birds

After touring in support of their first album the band continued to write and produce new music. As of July 2012 Tough was finishing the tracking and overdubs on eight songs for their upcoming EP. The album was then mixed by Reid Shippen, Keller Jahner, Drew Adams (Dave Pensado), Ryan States and Brent Paschke.  John Foster and Cameron Morgan contributed to the songwriting of certain tracks, and the band has also worked with guitarist Reeves Gabrels.

Their sophomore album, I Hate Birds, was self-released on December 18, 2012. Several songs from the album went on to win or be nominated for awards.  "Falling Down," co-written by Moore, Tough, and John Foster, won the Grand Prize at the John Lennon Songwriting Contest in the electronic category.  Two more songs placed in the Indie International Songwriting Contest in spring 2013; "I Hate Birds," co-written with Sarah Majors, won second in the rock category, while "Made of Stars," co-written with A. Krause, came in second in the pop category.

About the track "I Need Money" from I Hate Birds, Raw Ramp stated "Along with chippa acoustic strums and plucks, and a chirping rhythm that rattles along briskly, Deanna's voice – rich in cocoa butter oil – oozes from the cracks to melt into the fabric of the song." About the musical style, the review further stated, "The tune seems cheerful and full of hope ... ironically it's all about a relationship going sour and the clinging, carping attitude that occurs before an inevitable closure."

2013-14: Recent years

The band's music has been placed in movies, television and commercials. "Passing Train" was featured in multiple episodes of Alaska Gold Diggers, and in late 2013 their song "Heartbeat" was featured on the television show Twisted. The band has also released several official music videos. A video for their song "Stop The Traffic" was released in spring 2014, and according to a review, "The clip features...stunning imagery in a busy metropolitan nighttime setting." The music video for "Six Billion Lonely People," performed by the band, came out in July 2014.

As of May 2014 the band is based in Nashville, Tennessee, where they continue to work on new music in their Nashville studio. Tough simultaneously is a music industry educator at Belmont University, and continues to produce/write other projects as well. For example, in 2012-2013 he wrote and produced nine songs for the television show Hart of Dixie. Xavier and Ophelia band periodically performs live as a duo or with a backing band, with Tough switching between instruments such as guitar and keyboards. They regularly perform at The Bluebird Cafe in Nashville.

Style

Xavier and Ophelia is often categorized as an indie rock and electropop band, and much of their music mixes live instruments such as acoustic guitar and drums with electronic production. According to Raw Ramp, "their sounds combine easy-listening melodies with electronic pop elements...[and] the angelic voice of DeAnna Moore is always centre-stage." The band has cited artists such as Goldfrapp as musical influences.

Members
Dave Tough – guitars, bass guitar, percussion, various instruments
DeAnna Moore – lead vocals

Discography

Albums

Singles

Awards and nominations

Further reading
Xavier and Ophelia at Allmusic

References

External links
XandOMusic.com

2009 establishments in Tennessee
Alternative rock groups from Tennessee
Musical groups from Nashville, Tennessee
Musical groups established in 2009
American musical duos
Electronic music duos
Rock music duos
Male–female musical duos